The Rebirth of Venus is the seventh studio album by Australian indie pop musician Ben Lee, released on 10 February 2009 by New West Records.

A portion of the proceedings attained from the record are to be donated to FINCA International's village banking program. A press release said FINCA "offers financial services, not charity, to the world's lowest-income women entrepreneurs. This creates jobs, builds assets and generally improves the standard of living in these destitute communities."

Critical response to the album has been largely negative, with particular mention of the song 'I'm a Woman, Too' (which Andrew P Street of Time Out Sydney described as reaching "a conclusion so baffling that it defies any criticism that isn't expressed via a crowbar to the jaw").

The album features Missy Higgins, Nic Johns, Cary Brothers, Patience Hodgson, John Alagia (Ripe producer) and Lara Meyerratken.

Track listing
All songs written by Ben Lee, except where noted.
 "What's So Bad (About Feeling Good)" – 4:39
 "Surrender" – 3:16
 "Sing" – 3:15
 "I Love Pop Music" – 3:35
 "Rise Up" – 4:25
 "Yoko Ono" – 3:42
 "Boy with a Barbie" – 3:27
 "Bad Poetry" (Lee, Carrick Moore Gerety) – 3:41
 "Blue Denim" – 4:03
 "Wake Up to America" (Lee, Jason Schwartzman) – 4:27
 "I'm a Woman, Too" – 3:21
 "Families Cheating at Board Games" – 5:42
 "Song for the Divine Mother of the Universe" – 3:38

Bonus CD (Limited 2CD version)
 "New Wave" (originally by Against Me!)
 "Rock Boys" (originally by The Grates)
 "Ben Lee" (originally by The Ataris)
 "Woman Is the Nigger of the World" (originally by John Lennon)
 "Kids" (originally by MGMT)
 "Throw Your Arms Around Me" (originally by Hunters and Collectors)

Personnel
John Alagia, Cary Brothers, Justin Carroll, Michael Chavez, Brian Conrad, Missy Higgins, Patience Hodgson, Laura Jansen, Melissa McCarty, Eric Robinson, Ione Skye, Maria Teresa Suarez, Olivia Asta Wood, Vanessa Wood: backing vocals
Jack Graddis: guitars
Nick Johns: acoustic, electric and bass guitars, autoharp, keyboards, piano, drums, percussion
Ben Lee: electric and acoustic guitars, piano
Travis Aaron McNabb: drums, percussion
Lara Meyerratken: acoustic, electric and bass guitars, keyboards, piano, drums, percussion
Jason Nesmith: slide guitar
Kate Netto: percussion, backing vocals
Ezra Reich: guitars
Chick Wolverton: percussion
Brad Wood: electric and synthesized bass, drums, percussion

Production
Produced and mixed by Brad Wood
Recorded and engineered by Nick Johns (drums), Mike Terry (drums) and Brad Wood
Mastered by Greg Calbi

Charts

References

2009 albums
Ben Lee albums
New West Records albums
Universal Records albums
Albums produced by Brad Wood